Jeff Spear (born June 28, 1988) is an American sabre fencer. He competed in the men's team sabre competition at the 2012 Summer Olympics.

He fenced for the Columbia Lions fencing team.  Spear graduated from Columbia University in 2010 as the salutatorian of Columbia College.

See also
List of USFA Division I National Champions

References

1988 births
Living people
American male sabre fencers
Olympic fencers of the United States
Fencers at the 2012 Summer Olympics
Sportspeople from Albany, New York
Pan American Games medalists in fencing
Pan American Games gold medalists for the United States
Fencers at the 2015 Pan American Games
Columbia Lions fencers
Medalists at the 2015 Pan American Games